Ravenscliffe is a housing estate in the Eccleshill ward of the city of Bradford District, in the English county of West Yorkshire. Ravenscliffe is located to the west of Fagley Beck and to the east of the A658 Harrogate Road.
The buildings that were Ravenscliff farmhouse are situated off to the south in Fagley
while Ravenscliffe Woods are in Pudsey to the south east.

On 10th of July 2001, Ravenscliffe was subject to rioting on the estate, this was just after the Manningham riots.
Now, Ravenscliffe has a large newly built housing development, two shops and an Indian takeaway.
The Gateway centre which is adjacent to the shops, as a pre-school nursery and the centre also helps the disadvantaged, elderly and vulnerable tenants of the community.

Landmarks 

On Harrogate Road can be found Eccleshill Swimming Pool,
a public house,
Holybrook Primary School playing fields, the clubhouse of Eccleshill Sports and Social Club and Victoria Park sports ground where Victoria Rangers play rugby football (inactive)
East of the playing fields is the Eccleshill Community Hospital
and Eccleshill Park—an area of grassland and the Eccleshill Adventure Playground.
In the middle of Ravenscliffe is a sub post office
and The Gateway Community and Children's Centre.
To the north Ravenscliffe merges with Greengates.

References

External links 

 Eccleshill Adventure Playground
 The Gateway Community Centre.

Areas of Bradford